Ana Jovanović (born 28 December 1984) is a Serbian former professional tennis player. She was coached by Nikola Pilić.

Tennis career
During her career, she won nine titles in singles and one title in doubles on tournaments of the ITF Circuit.

Playing for Serbia in the Fed Cup, Jovanović has a win–loss record of 3–6.

Following her playing career, she was hired as a coach at the Novak Tennis Academy when it opened in November 2011.

ITF Circuit finals

Singles: 18 (9–8)

Doubles: 4 (1–3)

Fed Cup participation

Singles (3–2)

 PO = Playoff
 RR = Round Robin

Doubles (0–4)

 CND = Cancelled
 PO = Playoff
 RR = Round Robin

References

External links
 
 
 

1984 births
Living people
Tennis players from Belgrade
Tennis players from Munich
Serbian female tennis players
Serbian tennis coaches
Serbia and Montenegro female tennis players
Serbian expatriate sportspeople in Germany